Mirza Ebrahim Khan Sahhafbashi (c. 1855–1922) was a pioneering Iranian photographer and cinematographer.

In 1904, Mirza Ebrahim Khan Sahhafbashi opened the first movie theater in Tehran.

He was also the man who opened the first "Hamām-e nomré" (a kind of public shower with separate bathrooms) in Iran. (History of Iran's Cinema, by Jamal Omid. In Abolqasem Rezaee's quotes about his father, Mirza Ebrahim.)

See also
Persian cinema

Mirza Ebrahim Khan Sahhafbashi
Year of birth uncertain
1922 deaths